E. prasina  may refer to:
 Elaphe prasina, the green trinket snake, green bush rat snake or green ratsnake, a colubrid snake species found in Asia
 Erythrura prasina, the pin-tailed parrotfinch, a bird species found in Southeast Asia
 Eugenia prasina, a plant species endemic to Brazil

See also
 Prasina (disambiguation)